The Cameron Range is a small, low mountain range in northwestern British Columbia, Canada, located on the north side of Port Chanal on the western side of Graham Island of Haida Gwaii.

References

Queen Charlotte Mountains